Old Court may refer to the following:

Old Court Road, a major road in Baltimore County, Maryland
Old Court Metro Subway Station, one of 14 stops on the Baltimore Metro Subway
Old Court Savings and Loans, a bank that collapsed during the 1980s
Old Court-New Court controversy, a political controversy in Kentucky
Old Courthouse (disambiguation)